Warren Rosser (born 2 October 1962) is an Australian judoka. He competed in the men's half-lightweight event at the 1988 Summer Olympics.

References

External links
 

1962 births
Living people
Australian male judoka
Olympic judoka of Australia
Judoka at the 1988 Summer Olympics
Place of birth missing (living people)